Lake Barrington is an artificial lake in northern Tasmania, located  south of Devonport. The foreshore is protected by the Tasmanian Government as a nature recreation area.

Recreation activities

Rowing
Lake Barrington is the site of a world-standard rowing course. It hosted the 1990 World Rowing Championships and several Australian Rowing Championships, and hosts the annual Tasmanian schools Head of the River rowing regatta.

Lake Barrington hosted the Australian Championships in 1984
1987, 1987, 1990 1994, 1997, 2003, 2006, 2009, and 2021.

Water Skiing
There are two water ski clubs based at Lake Barrington: Kentish Aquatic Club and Horsehead Water Ski Club.

See also

List of reservoirs and dams in Tasmania

References

Barrington
Protected areas of Tasmania
North West Tasmania
Barrington